Eumetula pulla is a species of sea snail, a gastropod in the family Newtoniellidae. It was described by Philippi, in 1845.

Description 
The maximum recorded shell length is 19 mm.

Habitat 
Minimum recorded depth is 0 m. Maximum recorded depth is 274 m.

References

Newtoniellidae
Gastropods described in 1845